Keklikköy is a village in the Çermik District of Diyarbakır Province in Turkey.

References

Villages in Çermik District